The 1990 AAA Championships was an outdoor track and field competition organised by the Amateur Athletic Association (AAA), held from 3–4 August at Alexander Stadium in Birmingham, England. It was considered the de facto national championships for the United Kingdom, ahead of the 1990 UK Athletics Championships.

Medal summary

Men

Women

References

AAA Championships
AAA Championships
Athletics Outdoor
AAA Championships
Sports competitions in Birmingham, West Midlands
Athletics competitions in England